Guruvayurappan also often rendered Guruvayoorappan, is a form of Vishnu worshipped mainly in Kerala. He is the presiding deity of the  temple, who is worshipped as Krishna in his child form, also known as Guruvayur Unnikkannan (literally, Little Krishna). Even though the deity is that of chaturbahu (four handed) Vishnu, the sankalpam (concept) of the people is that the deity is the infant form of Krishna Only.

Etymology 
The word Guruvayurappan, meaning Father/Lord of Guruvayur, comes from the words Guru (ഗുരു) referring to Brihaspati, the Guru of the Devas, Vayu (വായു), the God of Wind, and Appan (അപ്പന്‍), meaning 'father' or 'lord' in Malayalam and Tamil. Since this guru and Vayu are regarded to have installed Krishna's deity, the name Guruvayurappan was given to the deity.

Iconography 
It is believed that the idol of Guruvayurappan was worshipped by Vasudeva and Devaki, the parents of Krishna, and represents the full manifestation of Vishnu, and was worshipped by Krishna, an avatar of Vishnu. The deity is made of a stone called "Patala Anjanam" or black bismuth, and is in the standing pose with four arms, carrying the Panchajanya (shanku or conch), the Sudarshana Chakra (chakra or disc), the Kaumodaki (gada or mace) and padma (lotus).

Origin

Chapter of Vishnu 
Though the main story about the idol starts with the story of Krishna, it is chronologically regarded to be older in regional tradition, since it is believed to have been constructed by Vishnu himself. The story is told in detail in the section 'Gurupavanapura Mahatmyam', from the Narada Purana. King Parikshit, the grandson of Arjuna, and the son of Abhimanyu, died of a bite by the poisonous snake Takshaka, due to a curse which had fallen upon him. King Janamejaya, his son, wanted to avenge his father's death by killing all the snakes, including Takshaka. He conducted a vigorous yajna called the 'Sarpahuti Yajna' (Snake sacrifice). Thousands of innocent snakes died in the yajna fire, but Takshaka could not be killed because he had consumed amritam, the nectar of immortality. Due to this act, Janamejaya was affected by the curse of snakes, and was affected by leprosy. He tried to cure his disease, but none of them worked. He lost his hope to live. At that time, the sage Atreya (the son of sage Atri) came to visit him and told him to worship Vishnu in Guruvayur. He then also told the glory of the temple. It is as follows:

Long ago, in the beginning of Padma Kalpa, when Brahma was undergoing his work of creation, Vishnu appeared before him. When the creator deity said that he and his creations wanted mukti (liberation) without the bondage of karma, Vishnu made an idol of himself and presented it to his friend. Brahma worshipped the idol with deep obeisance for a long time, and in the Varaha Kalpa, he gifted it to a sage named Sutapas and his wife Prsni, who were meditating upon Vishnu for begetting a child. Sutapas and Prashni continued their prayer after getting the idol, and finally God appeared before them. When they expressed their wish, which was that they want a son just like God, he told them that would himself be born as their son in three successive births, and in all the three births, they could worship his idol made by himself.

Chapter of Krishna 
In the first birth in the Satya Yuga, God took birth as Prsnigarbha, the son of Sutapas and Prsni. In this birth, he prophesied the importance of brahmacharya and offered darshana (a divine view of his form) to his devotee Dhruva, to whom he made a realm called Dhruvaloka. When Sutapas and Prsni were reborn as Kashyapa and Aditi, God took birth as their son Vamana in the Treta Yuga. Finally, when they were reborn as Vasudeva and Devaki, God was born as their eighth son, Krishna. In all the three births, they had the fortune to worship the holy idol of Vishnu made by God himself.

After coming back from his studies, Krishna took the idol worshipped by his parents to Dvaraka, his new abode. He built a temple for the idol here, and daily worshipped the idol with deep veneration, despite being an avatar of Vishnu himself. Finally, the Dvapara Yuga came to an end. Now, it was time for God to return to his original abode. Before leaving to Vaikuntha, he called his friend and disciple Uddhava and told him that Dvaraka would be affected by a deluge a week from then, and the lone non-natural survivor of the flood would be the divine idol worshipped by his parents in his three births. He also advised him to hand over the idol to Brihaspati, the Guru of the Devas who would come at that moment, and leave to Badrikashram for performing a penance for the rest of his life.

As God had prophesied, there was a huge deluge on the week that followed. Dvaraka, which was filled by beautiful palaces, gardens, and lush greenery, was completely destroyed in the deluge. Only the top of a huge mountain survived. Uddhava had already left to Badrikashram for performing his penance, and before leaving, he sent a message to Brihaspati, and informed him about the idol. By the time Brihaspati reached Dvaraka, everything had been wiped out. But soon, he saw the holy idol of Vishnu floating upon the seawater. Brihaspati was overjoyed, but he could not go near the idol due to the nature of the deluge, and since it was floating towards the other side. He called upon Vayu, the wind god and one among his important disciples. Vayu, with the help of Varuna, the sea god, created huge waves towards the point where Brihaspati was standing. Brihaspati took the idol in his hands, but he did not know where to install it. Suddenly, the sage Parashurama appeared, and told them to install the idol in an appropriate location in Bhargava Kshetra. the land he had created with his axe.

According to the wishes of the sage, Brihaspati and Vayu took the idol on their hands, and travelled by sky southwards through the sky to find an appropriate location in the Bhargava Kshetra. Suddenly, they saw a large, beautiful lake on the western side of Bhargava Kshetra, very close to the sea. Adjacent to it, there was lush greenery. Birds chirped all over. Animals were running happily. Breeze spread everywhere. Brihaspati and Vayu realised that there was something divine about this place. They saw Shiva and his consort Parvati dancing on the lake shore. Brihaspati and Vayu landed on the ground and prostrated before the divine couple. Shiva told them that he had been waiting for their arrival, and that the perfect spot for installing the idol of Vishnu was none other the place that they were standing. Shiva then declared that since the idol is to be installed by Brihaspati, the Guru and Vayu, the place would be called 'Guruvayur', and the devotees would find solace here from the troubles of the Kali Yuga.

After hearing this, Brihaspati called Vishvakarma, the divine architect, and told him to construct a temple for the deity. Vishvakarma constructed the temple within minutes, with all the necessary components. Brihaspati and Vayu installed the idol with all necessary rituals. Shiva performed the first pooja to the deity. Demigods, headed by Indra, showered flowers. The sage Narada sang a number of songs. Since the idol had been installed by Brihaspati and Vayu, the place came to be known as Guruvayur, and the deity came to be known as Guruvayurappan, meaning, the 'God of Guruvayur'. It is considered that Vishnu resides here with his full power as in Vaikuntha, and thus the place is called 'Bhuloka Vaikuntha'.

After hearing this story, Janamejaya proceeded to Guruvayur along with his family, and stayed there for a year. During these days, he worshipped God with much devotion, and also visited the Mammiyur temple to worship Shiva. Finally, on the day before the end of his worship, he had a darshana of Krishna, after which his disease was cured. He returned to his country, and lived happily thereafter.

Regional myths
An astrologer told a Pandya King that he was destined to die from a cobra bite on a particular day. He was advised to go and pray before Guruvayurappan. The king spent years in meditation and prayer at the feet of the deity. One day, the King realized that the time of his death had passed. He came back to his palace and asked the astrologer why the prediction was wrong. The wise man showed him the mark on his left foot where the cobra had bitten him. Since the king was wholly absorbed in God, Who alone can dispense with fate, he did not feel the sting. In gratitude, the King built the temple at Guruvayur and set apart funds for the daily routine of the temple. Most of the current temple building dates to the 16th and 17th centuries, although rich devotees funded extensions and additions later. The deepastamba (column of lights) was erected in 1836 by a devotee from Thiruvananthapuram. The temple has gopurams in the east and the west. The eastern gopuram has an inscription which refers to the town as "Gurupavanapura". The western gopuram was built in 1747.

King Manaveda and Vilwamangalam:King Manaveda told Vilwamangalam about his ambition to view Krishna The next day the Swamiyar told him that Guruvayurappan has given his consent and Manavedan can see Guruvayurappan playing in the early hours of the morning at the platform of the Elanji tree.He could only see and not touch Him. When as per this agreement, Manavedan saw Guruvayurappan in the form of little child Krishna, he was so excited that he forgot himself and, rushed to embrace little Krishna. Guruvayoorappan immediately disappeared saying, "Vilwamangalam did not tell me that this will happen". However, Manavedan got one peacock feather from the headgear of Bhagavan Krishna.

The peacock feather was incorporated in the headgear for the character of Krishna in the dance drama Krishnanattam based on his own text krishnageeti which is composed of eight chapters viz, Avatharam, Kaliyamardanam, Rasakrida, Kamsavadham, Swayamvaram, Banayuddham, Vividavadham and Swargarohanam. It was performed near the sanctum sanctorum of the Guruvayur Temple. On the ninth day, Avatharam was repeated as the Samoothiri felt that it was not auspicious to end the series with the demise of Krishna. The blessed art form is still maintained by guruvayur devaswom and staged as an offering by devotees.

Shopkeeper and boy: Once, a poor boy could not get even a morsel of food to appease his hunger, and stole a banana from a nearby fruit shop. Being a devotee of Lord Guruvayurappan, he dropped half the banana into the 'hundi' and he ate the other half. The shop-keeper caught hold of the boy and accused him of the theft. The boy admitted his guilt. The shop-keeper did not have the heart to punish this innocent boy, but to teach him a lesson, he ordered him to walk around the temple a certain number of times. The shop-keeper was aghast when he saw Lord Guruvayurappan follow the little boy around the temple. That night God came to the shopkeeper in a dream and explained, "Since I have also had a share in the stolen banana I am bound to share the punishment, too. So, I followed the boy around the temple." 

Nenmini Unni: Once a Nenmini Namboodiri, the main priest (melsanthi) at the Guruvayur temple, instructed his twelve-year-old son to offer the Nivedyam to God. There was no assistant priest (keezhsanthi) on that day and the Nenmini Namboodiri had to go out on an urgent engagement, as called by a devotee. The son, Unni, offered a Nivedyam of cooked rice to God; in his simplicity, he believed that the deity would eat the food, but the deity did not move. Unni bought some salted mangoes and curd from a neighborhood vendor, thinking that God would prefer this, mixed the curd with rice and offered it again. The deity again remained unmoved. Unni cajoled, requested, coaxed and in the end threatened, but the deity remained unmoved. He wept because he believed he had failed and shouted at God, exclaiming that his father would beat him. God could not bear it any more, and made the Nivedyam disappear. The boy left the temple satisfied. Unni did not know that the Nivedyam offered to God was the Variyar's prerequisite. When Variyar returned to the temple, he saw the empty plate and became very angry with Unni, but Unni insisted that God had, in fact, eaten the offering. Unni's innocent words made Variyar furious, as he believed the boy had eaten the offering himself and was lying. His father was about to beat Unni, but just then an Asareeri (celestial voice) was heard saying, "What Unni told is right. I am guilty. Unni is innocent. I ate all the food that he had offered me. There's no need to punish him".  Nenmini family is still there in Guruvayur, and is still wealthy. It also sponsors the Saptami (7th day) Vilakku during the annual Ekadasi festival in the Malayalam month of Vrischikam.

Poonthanam and Melpathur:  Poonthanam was a contemporary of Melpathur Narayana Bhattathiri, another famous poet associated with Guruvayur. Melpathur, the author of the Sanskrit work Narayaneeyam, was a famed scholar who out of pride refused Poonthanam's request to read his Jnanappana, a work in Malayalam. Legend has it that Guruvayurappan, impressed by Poonthanam's humility and devotion preferred his works to those of Bhattathiri's and once even rebuked Bhattathiri for ignoring Poonthanam's Santhanagopala Paana saying he preferred Poonthanam's genuine bhakti to Bhattathiri's vibhakti.

See also
 Guruvayoor Temple
 Guruvayoor

Notes

References

External links
 http://www.gurupavanapuri.com 
 http://www.thanjavurpaintings.com/lguruvayur.html
 http://www.guruvayurdevaswom.org/lnenmini.shtml
 https://web.archive.org/web/20070417154306/http://www.madhuramurali.org/swamigal/bok/jun00_bok.html
 http://www.narayaneeyam.com
 Guruvayur Idols online

Forms of Vishnu
Hinduism in Kerala
Guruvayur